Charles Randolph Korsmo (born July 20, 1978) is an American lawyer and actor. He is best known for portraying the Kid from the film adaption of Dick Tracy and Jack Banning in Hook.

Personal life and acting work
Korsmo was born in Fargo, North Dakota, the son of Deborah Ruf, an educational psychologist, and John Korsmo, former owner of Cass County Abstract and former chairman of the Federal Housing Finance Board. He was raised in the Minneapolis suburb of Golden Valley, where he attended and graduated from Breck School in 1996. He has one older brother, Ted (born 1976), and one younger brother, Joe (born 1983).

He is married to Adrienne, with whom he has a daughter, Lilah, and a son, William.

Korsmo's acting roles included The Kid/Dick Tracy, Jr. in Dick Tracy; Siggy, the son of Richard Dreyfuss's character, in What About Bob?, and Jack Banning, the son of Peter Pan in the 1991 film Hook. His final film role until 2019 was the supporting character William Lichter in the 1998 film Can't Hardly Wait.

Post-acting career
Korsmo earned a degree in physics from the Massachusetts Institute of Technology in 2000. Korsmo has worked for the Environmental Protection Agency, and for the Republican Party in the House of Representatives. He received his Juris Doctor degree from Yale Law School in 2006.

At Yale, he was a member of the Federalist Society, an organization for conservative and libertarian lawyers and law students. In January 2006, he and other Yale Law students signed an open letter to Pennsylvania Senator Arlen Specter supporting the nomination of Samuel Alito to the Supreme Court. In July 2007, Korsmo passed the New York State Bar exam. Formerly an associate in the New York office of Sullivan & Cromwell LLP and a visiting professor at Brooklyn Law School, Korsmo is currently a professor of corporate law & corporate finance at the Case Western Reserve University School of Law in Cleveland.

In May 2011, it was announced that Korsmo had been nominated by President Barack Obama as a member of the Board of Trustees of the Barry Goldwater Scholarship and Excellence in Education Foundation.

Filmography

References

External links

 

1978 births
20th-century American male actors
American male child actors
American legal scholars
Case Western Reserve University faculty
Federalist Society members
Living people
MIT Department of Physics alumni
New York (state) Republicans
People from Suffolk County, New York
Lawyers from Fargo, North Dakota
Yale Law School alumni
Male actors from Minnesota
Activists from New York (state)
Sullivan & Cromwell associates